Micropleudidae is a family of nematodes belonging to the order Camallanida.

Genera:
 Micropleura

References

Nematodes